Mississauga—Malton is a federal electoral district in Ontario. It encompasses a portion of Ontario previously included in the electoral districts of Bramalea—Gore—Malton, Mississauga—Brampton South and Mississauga—Streetsville.

Mississauga—Malton was created by the 2012 federal electoral boundaries redistribution and was legally defined in the 2013 representation order. It came into effect upon the call of the 42nd Canadian federal election, scheduled for October 2015.

Demographics 
According to the 2021 Canada Census

Ethnic groups: 42.8% South Asian, 18.4% White, 11.0% Black, 5.6% Chinese, 5.5% Filipino, 3.8% Arab, 3.6% Southeast Asian, 2.1% Latin American, 1.0% West Asian

Languages: 39.0% English, 10.2% Punjabi, 5.8% Urdu, 2.8% Arabic, 2.8% Tagalog, 2.6% Hindi, 2.4% Vietnamese, 2.4% Tamil, 2.3% Gujarati, 2.1% Cantonese, 2.0% Mandarin, 1.7% Spanish, 1.6% Italian, 1.5% Portuguese, 1.5% Polish

Religions: 40.2% Christian (23.6% Catholic, 2.0% Christian Orthodox, 1.8% Pentecostal, 1.0% Anglican, 11.8% Other), 17.1% Muslim, 14.8% Hindu, 12.0% Sikh, 2.9% Buddhist, 12.3% None

Median income: $34,800 (2020)

Average income: $44,920 (2020)

Members of Parliament
This riding has elected the following Members of Parliament:

Election results

References

Ontario federal electoral districts
Politics of Mississauga
2013 establishments in Ontario